Palamedes  (also called Palomides , or some other variant such as the French Palamède; known as li Sarradins that is "the Saracen") is a Knight of the Round Table in the Arthurian legend. He is a Middle Eastern pagan who converts to Christianity later in his life, and his unrequited love for Iseult brings him into frequent conflict with Tristan. Palamedes' father King Esclabor and brothers Safir and Segwarides also join the Round Table. The romance Palamedes was named after him.

In medieval stories

Palamedes first appears in the Prose Tristan, an early 13th-century prose expansion of the Tristan and Iseult legend. He is introduced as a knight fighting for Princess Iseult's hand at a tournament in Ireland; he ultimately loses to the protagonist Tristan, to the delight of the princess. Tristan spares him but forbids him to bear arms for a year or to pursue Iseult's love ever again. After Iseult's wedding to King Mark, Palamedes rescues Iseult's servant Brangaine, joins the Round Table and engages in a number of duels with Tristan that are usually postponed or end without a clear winner. They eventually reconcile, but share a love–hate relationship through the rest of the narrative.

Palamedes also appears in the Post-Vulgate Cycle, Thomas Malory's Le Morte d'Arthur, and even gave his name to his own prose romance, the early 13th-century Palamedes that now exists only in fragments, detailing the adventures of two generations of Arthurian heroes. Some stories reveal Palamedes' background: his father Esclabor was an exiled king of Babylon who traveled to Britain, where he rescued and befriended King Pellinore.

Many tales also have Palamedes as the hunter of the Questing Beast, an abomination only the chosen can kill. The hunt is as frustrating and fruitless as the pursuit of Iseult, and in most versions remains uncompleted. However, in the Post-Vulgate Palamedes' conversion to Christianity during the Grail Quest allows him release from his worldly entanglements, and Percival and Galahad help him trap the beast in a lake, where he finally slays it.

Malory has Palamedes and his brother Safir joining Lancelot after the great knight's affair with Queen Guinevere is exposed. The brothers eventually accompany Lancelot to France, where Palamedes is made Duke of Provence. In the Post-Vulgate Cycle he is eventually killed by Gawain as vengeance for Palamedes' killing of King Mark, who had been incited by Mordred to kill his wife Iseult's lover, Tristan, with Palamedes' spear.

In modern culture
In The Once and Future King by T. H. White, Palamedes (as Sir Palomides) appears in Part Two, The Queen of Air and Darkness, as a questing partner of King Pellinore. (In the original version, The Witch in the Wood, Sir Palomides was tutor to the sons of King Lot.) Sir Palomides attempts to aid Pellinore in his pursuit of the Questing Beast and then assumes the quest himself. Like White's Pellinore, Sir Palomides is a broad comic character. His death at the hands of Gawain receives mention in Part Four, The Candle in the Wind.
Palamedes is a character in the book series The Secrets of the Immortal Nicholas Flamel by Michael Scott.
The story is also referenced by Aleister Crowley in The High History of the Good Sir Palamedes (published in The Equinox, volume 1, number 4, special supplement).
Marcel Proust gave the name to a character in his In Search of Lost Time, Palamède baron de Charlus.
In The Black Knight (1954), Sir Palamedes is played by Peter Cushing as a traitorous spy in the court of King Arthur.
In Gideon the Ninth by Tamsyn Muir, Palamedes Sextus is a highly skilled necromancer who also holds the rank of Master Warden of the Library. He is often accompanied by his cavalier and sworn sword, Camilla Hect.

References

External links
Palamades at The Camelot Project

Arthurian characters
Legendary Arab people
Fictional princes
Knights of the Round Table